Harel Srugo (born 15 March 1982) is an Israeli professional tennis player and competes mainly on the ATP Challenger Tour and ITF Futures, both in singles and doubles.

Srugo reached his highest ATP singles ranking, No. 703 on 8 April 2002, and his highest ATP doubles ranking, No. 460, on 23 February 2004.

ATP career finals (1)

Doubles (1)

References

External links

1982 births
Living people
Israeli male tennis players